League of Workers Association Youth was a socialist youth movement in Finland 1917-1928. TJN organized children and youth up to the age of 16. The activities of TJN resembled scouting.

References

1917 establishments in Finland
1928 disestablishments
Youth organisations based in Finland